Tomislav Pajović (born 15 March 1986) is a Serbian professional footballer who plays as a defender for Budućnost Dobanovci.

Club career
Pajović came through the youth system of Partizan, before going on loan to several clubs, including Dinamo Vranje and Bežanija. He subsequently played for two more Belgrade-based clubs, Čukarički and Rad, before moving abroad and signing for Moldovan club Sheriff Tiraspol in the summer of 2012. In February 2013, Pajović returned to his parent club Partizan on loan until the end of the season. He helped them win the league title, recording 12 appearances in the process. After being loaned to Hapoel Be'er Sheva for one season, Pajović signed with the Israeli side on a permanent basis in June 2014.

International career
Pajović represented FR Yugoslavia at the 2002 UEFA European Under-17 Championship. He made one appearance for the Serbia national under-21 team, coming on as a substitute in a friendly against Israel U21 on 19 November 2008.

Honours
Partizan
 Serbian SuperLiga: 2012–13

Notes

References

External links
 
 
 

1986 births
Living people
Association football defenders
Sportspeople from Užice
Serbia and Montenegro footballers
Serbian footballers
Serbian expatriate footballers
Serbia under-21 international footballers
FC Sheriff Tiraspol players
FK Budućnost Podgorica players
FK Čukarički players
FK Dinamo Vranje players
FK Partizan players
FK Rad players
FK Radnik Surdulica players
FK Napredak Kruševac players
FK Teleoptik players
FK Zemun players
Navbahor Namangan players
Hapoel Be'er Sheva F.C. players
Maccabi Sha'arayim F.C. players
Vasas SC players
FK Kolubara players
FK Budućnost Dobanovci players
Israeli Premier League players
Moldovan Super Liga players
Montenegrin First League players
Nemzeti Bajnokság I players
Serbian First League players
Serbian SuperLiga players
Uzbekistan Super League players
Serbian expatriate sportspeople in Hungary
Serbian expatriate sportspeople in Israel
Serbian expatriate sportspeople in Moldova
Serbian expatriate sportspeople in Montenegro
Serbian expatriate sportspeople in Uzbekistan
Expatriate footballers in Hungary
Expatriate footballers in Israel
Expatriate footballers in Moldova
Expatriate footballers in Montenegro
Expatriate footballers in Uzbekistan